Love, Save the Empty is the 2008 debut album by American pop rock singer Erin McCarley. It was released digitally through Universal Republic Records on iTunes on December 30, 2008. The hard copy was released on January 6, 2009. Jamie Kenney, McCarley's musical partner, produced the album and also arranged, played, and co-wrote most of the songs.

McCarley toured throughout January to promote her release. Love, Save the Empty peaked at No. 5 on iTunes "Top Albums" chart on January 2, 2009, resulting in a No. 86 debut on the Billboard 200 in the issue dated January 17, 2009. The following week, the album rose ten spots to a new peak of 76.

In addition, all three of her singles released from the album charted. The song "Love, Save the Empty" is the song featured mostly in He's Just Not That Into You and is the only track featured in the film with has a music video.  Both "Love, Save the Empty" and "Pitter-Pat" were featured on the fifth season of Grey's Anatomy.  "Love, Save the Empty" was included in the first season of the CW's show Privileged.  "Pony (It's OK)" and "Pitter-Pat" were featured in One Tree Hill.

Both "Pony (It's OK)" and "Pitter-Pat" have been on the Triple A (Adult Album Alternative) chart, and "Love, Save the Empty" made the Hot Adult Top 40 (or Hot AC) chart as well as VH1's Top 20 Video Countdown, where it peaked at No. 17.

Track listing

References

2008 debut albums
Erin McCarley albums
Republic Records albums